Kostyuninskaya is a rural locality (a village) in Mityukovskoye Rural Settlement, Vozhegodsky District, Vologda Oblast, Russia. The population was 83 as of 2002.

Geography 
The distance to Vozhega is 72 km, to Sosnovitsa is 4 km. Popovka, Vasilyevskaya, Timoshinskaya are the nearest rural localities.

References 

Rural localities in Vozhegodsky District